The men's 5000 metres event at the 2004 World Junior Championships in Athletics was held in Grosseto, Italy, at Stadio Olimpico Carlo Zecchini on 18 July.

Medalists

Results

Final
18 July

Participation
According to an unofficial count, 22 athletes from 17 countries participated in the event.

References

5000 metres
Long distance running at the World Athletics U20 Championships